James Norwich Arbuthnot, Baron Arbuthnot of Edrom,  (born 4 August 1952), is a British Conservative Party politician.  He was Member of Parliament (MP) for Wanstead and Woodford from 1987 to 1997, and then MP for North East Hampshire from 1997 to 2015.

Arbuthnot served as chairman of the Defence Select Committee from 2005 to 2014, before being nominated as a life peer in the Dissolution Peerages List 2015 of August 2015.

Created Baron Arbuthnot of Edrom, of Edrom in the County of Berwick, on 1 October 2015, Lord Arbuthnot sits on the Conservative benches in the House of Lords.

Early life

Arbuthnot was born in Deal, Kent, the second son of Sir John Arbuthnot, 1st Baronet, MP for Dover between 1950 and 1964, and Margaret Jean Duff. He was educated at Wellesley House School in Broadstairs and Eton College, where he was captain of School, before going up to Trinity College, Cambridge, where he obtained a law degree (BA) in 1974.

Arbuthnot was called to the Bar by Lincoln's Inn in 1975 and became a practising barrister. An active member of the Chelsea Conservative Association, he was elected a councillor of the Royal Borough of Kensington and Chelsea in 1978, and remained a councillor until he was elected to the House of Commons in 1987. In 1980 he became the vice-chairman of the Chelsea Conservative Association.

Arbuthnot contested the Cynon Valley seat, in the Labour heartland of industrial South Wales, at the 1983 general election and was defeated by Ioan Evans. A year later in 1984, Evans died and Arbuthnot fought the resulting by-election, but he was again defeated by the Labour candidate, Ann Clwyd.

Member of Parliament

In government (1988–1997)
In the 1987 general election Arbuthnot was chosen to contest the safe Conservative seat of Wanstead and Woodford, as the sitting MP, Patrick Jenkin, was standing down. Arbuthnot won the seat and increased the Conservative majority by over 2,000 to 16,412.

In 1988 he became the Parliamentary Private Secretary (PPS) to Archie Hamilton at the Ministry of Defence, and in 1990 became the PPS to the Secretary of State for Trade and Industry, Peter Lilley. He entered the John Major government after the 1992 general election when he was made an Assistant Government Whip. He was promoted in 1994 as the Parliamentary Under-Secretary of State at the Department of Social Security. The following year he was promoted to Minister for Defence Procurement, where he remained until the end of the Major government in 1997.

Arbuthnot stated that one of his most pleasing parliamentary achievements was "organising an all-party meeting with the Prime Minister for the exoneration of the pilots of the Chinook that crashed on the Mull of Kintyre in 1994".

In opposition (1997–2010)
Arbuthnot's seat of Wanstead and Woodford was abolished at the 1997 general election, when he was selected for the new seat of North East Hampshire. In Opposition, he was a member of William Hague's Shadow Cabinet as the Conservative Party's Chief Whip until the 2001 general election when he returned to the backbenches. He was sworn of the Privy Council in 1998.

Arbuthnot returned to the Shadow Cabinet under Michael Howard as Shadow Trade Secretary in 2003, but stood down after the 2005 general election. Since that election he served as the chairman of the influential Defence Select Committee and was Chair of the Special Select Committee set up to scrutinise the Bill that became the Armed Forces Act 2011.  He is a Senior Associate Fellow of the Royal United Services Institute.

Arbuthnot was the parliamentary chairman of the Conservative Friends of Israel. He was also a member of the Top Level Group of UK Parliamentarians for Multilateral Nuclear Disarmament and Non-proliferation, established in October 2009.

In the 2009 expenses scandal, Arbuthnot apologised and repaid the public money he had claimed for his swimming pool to be cleaned. Later that year, he was further criticised in the press for £15,000 of expenses he claimed for upkeep at his second home, including tree surgery and painting his summer house.

In government (2010–2015)
In June 2011 Arbuthnot announced that he would not contest the next general election. On 16 January 2015, he publicly declared his atheism, stating "the pressure on a Conservative politician, particularly of keeping quiet about not being religious, is very similar to the pressure that there has been about keeping quiet about being gay"; he later clarified that he is not gay.

Arbuthnot has been playing a pivotal role in helping the Sub Postmasters affected by the Great Post Office Scandal to seek justice after the post office wronglyand, it has been alleged, knowinglysought and obtained convictions for theft, fraud and false accounting against a large number of them.

Personal life
On 6 September 1984, Arbuthnot married Emma Louise Broadbent, daughter of Michael Broadbent, Wine Director of Christie's.   Since 2020 she has been a Justice of the High Court, having previously served as the Senior District Judge (Chief Magistrate) for England and Wales.

James Arbuthnot is the chairman of the advisory board of the UK division of multinational defence and security systems manufacturer Thales. He is a Senior Associate Fellow of the defence and security think tank Royal United Services Institute for Defence and Security Studies.

He is a descendant of James V of Scotland. His middle name is after his great-great grandfather, Norwich Duff (1792-1862). He is also a distant cousin of Gerald Arbuthnot, the former MP for Burnley.

Arbuthnot and his wife have four children:

 Hon Alexander Arbuthnot (born 1986)
 Hon Kate Arbuthnot (born 1989)
 Hon Leaf Arbuthnot (born 1992)
 Hon Alice Arbuthnot (born 1998)

Lord and Lady Arbuthnot divide their time between London and Berkshire.

Arms

See also
 Clan Arbuthnott
 Court of Lord Lyon
 Disclosure of expenses of British Members of Parliament

References

External links

North East Hampshire Conservative Association

Burke's Peerage & Baronetage online

|-

|-

|-

|-

1952 births
Living people
People educated at Eton College
Alumni of Trinity College, Cambridge
James
English people of Scottish descent
Conservative Party (UK) MPs for English constituencies
Conservative Party (UK) life peers
Life peers created by Elizabeth II
Councillors in the Royal Borough of Kensington and Chelsea
English atheists
Members of Lincoln's Inn
Members of the Privy Council of the United Kingdom
People from Deal, Kent
Politics of Hampshire
UK MPs 1987–1992
UK MPs 1992–1997
UK MPs 1997–2001
UK MPs 2001–2005
UK MPs 2005–2010
UK MPs 2010–2015
Younger sons of baronets